Peltophryne guentheri, the southern crested toad or Gunther's Caribbean toad, is a species of toad in the family Bufonidae. It is endemic to Hispaniola and found in the lowlands of Haiti and the Dominican Republic.

Description
The dorsum has a yellowish tan ground color and is heavily overlaid with a very dark brown to black reticulated pattern.

Habitat and ecology
Natural habitats of Peltophryne guentheri are dry lowland valleys in both mesic and xeric areas. These frogs have been observed to sit on or near piles of cattle manure. They appear to use a sit-and-wait foraging strategy to catch insects on the manure.

Breeding takes place in temporary pools, including a rainwater-filled roadside ditch. Breeding is triggered by heavy rains, and the breeding season corresponds to the Atlantic hurricane season.

Conservation
It is threatened by habitat loss caused by livestock grazing and selective logging, and by agricultural pollution. All observations of these animals are from degraded habitats where the populations are facing further habitat degradation caused by urban development. A further threat is competition with and predation from introduced cane toads (Rhinella marina) and American bullfrogs (Lithobates catesbeianus). Males have also been observed attempting to mate with a male Rhinella marina.

References 

guentheri
Endemic fauna of Hispaniola
Amphibians of the Dominican Republic
Amphibians of Haiti
Amphibians described in 1941
Taxa named by Doris Mable Cochran
Taxonomy articles created by Polbot